Alexis Agustín Rodríguez (born 21 March 1996) is an Argentine professional footballer who plays as a left winger for Deportivo Municipal, on loan from Newell's Old Boys.

Career
Born in Rosario, Santa Fe, Rodríguez began in the youth team of hometown club Newell's Old Boys. He was promoted into the first-team when he was an unused substitute for an Argentine Primera División win over Olimpo on 27 May 2017.

Rodríguez's professional debut arrived on 26 November 2017 in a 3–1 win away to River Plate, as an 83rd-minute substitute for Brian Sarmiento. The following 5 May, he scored his first career goal in a 1–0 home win over Defensa y Justicia.

Personal life
He is the twin brother of Denis Rodríguez and cousin of Maxi Rodríguez, both of whom were his teammates at Newell's.

Career statistics
.

References

External links

1996 births
Living people
Argentine footballers
Argentine expatriate footballers
Footballers from Rosario, Santa Fe
Association football wingers
Argentine Primera División players
Peruvian Primera División players
Newell's Old Boys footballers
Deportivo Municipal footballers
Argentine expatriate sportspeople in Peru
Expatriate footballers in Peru